Eva Sisó Casals (born August 3, 1979) is a Spanish beauty queen who represented her country at the Miss Universe 2001 pageant in Puerto Rico.

Miss España 2001

Eva, a runway model, competed in the Miss España 2001 pageant, representing the province of Lleida, located in the Autonomous region of Catalunya. She won as first runner-up, with Lorena Van Heerde Ayala of Alicante winning the crown. However, Lorena was sent to the Miss Europe pageant and Eva was sent to the Miss Universe 2001 pageant. In Miss España 2001 she won several prizes, including Miss Elegance. It was also suggested that she did not win the crown due to political causes (she was Catalan) and some rumours also point to economical reasons, such the payment of a considerable amount of money by the delegation of Miss Alicante. Nevertheless, there are no clear evidences that support these scandals.

Miss Universe 2001
Eva was considered a favorite in the Miss Universe 2001 pageant. She was the first to be called to be in the Top 10, but she did not enter the Top 5. She was 21 years old when she competed in the pageant.

Trivia
 She was born in Soses a small village in Lleida.
 She wore a torero costume as her national costume.

References

External links
Eva Siso-Casals photos

1979 births
21st-century Nigerian businesspeople
Living people
Miss Universe 2001 contestants
Spanish beauty pageant winners
Spanish female models